The 2007 Porsche Carrera Cup Deutschland season was the 22nd German Porsche Carrera Cup season. It began on 22 April at Hockenheim and finished on 14 October at the same circuit, after nine races including a double-header at Lausitzring. It ran as a support championship for the 2007 DTM season. Uwe Alzen won the championship for the second time despite not winning any races.

Teams and drivers

Race calendar and results

Championship standings

Drivers' championship

† — Drivers did not finish the race, but were classified as they completed over 90% of the race distance.

References

External links
The Porsche Carrera Cup Germany website
Porsche Carrera Cup Germany Online Magazine

Porsche Carrera Cup Germany seasons
Porsche Carrera Cup Germany